North Lynnwood is a census-designated place (CDP) located in Snohomish County, Washington. In 2010, it had a population of 16,574 inhabitants. It was originally part of Picnic Point-North Lynnwood. For the 2010 census, the CDP was separated into Picnic Point and North Lynnwood, with a small part going to the new Meadowdale CDP.

Geography
North Lynnwood is located at coordinates 47°51'12"N 122°16'35"W. It has an area of 3.12 sq. miles.

Notable points of interest
Well Number 5

References

Census-designated places in Snohomish County, Washington